Ambohitrarivo is a town and commune in Madagascar. It belongs to the district of Amparafaravola, which is a part of Alaotra-Mangoro Region. The population of the commune was estimated to be approximately 23,000 in 2001 commune census.

Primary and junior level secondary education are available in town. The majority 80% of the population of the commune are farmers.  The most important crop is rice, while other important products are maize and cassava.  Industry and services provide employment for 5% and 10% of the population, respectively. Additionally fishing employs 5% of the population.

References and notes 

Populated places in Alaotra-Mangoro